Jesper Thygesen (born 20 September 1969) is a Danish football director, commentator, and former player. From 1991 to 2005, Thygesen played 296 games and scored 45 goals in the Danish Superliga. He played in the midfielder position, and represented Ikast FS, Silkeborg IF, Brøndby IF, and Randers FC, winning the 1998 Superliga and 1998 Danish Cup with Brøndby. He played 27 national youth team games, and represented the Denmark League XI national football team on seven occasions in 1997 and 1998.

He started his youth career with Randers Freja, before getting his breakthrough with Ikast FS. He returned to the Randers club, now known as Randers FC, in 2003, and ended his career with the team in 2005. He was a playing assistant manager in his final year in Randers FC. He was appointed as Director of the new Randers Football College in 2005, working there until the summer 2009. He served temporarily as attacking coach for Randers FC in the spring 2009.

Jesper Thygesen is currently a sports commentator for the Danish TV-station TV3 Sport.

References

External links
http://www.ligafodbold.dk/?cat=statsPlayerView&pID=1474&tID=0&cat_id=0
Danish national team profile
Danish Superliga statistics

1969 births
Living people
Danish men's footballers
Ikast FS players
Brøndby IF players
Silkeborg IF players
Randers FC players
Association football midfielders